Cingulina secernenda is a species of sea snail, a marine gastropod mollusk in the family Pyramidellidae, the pyrams and their allies.

Distribution
This species occurs in the northern portion of the Indian Ocean off the coasts of Pakistan, Asia.

References

External links
 To World Register of Marine Species

Pyramidellidae
Gastropods described in 1918